MEMA or mema or variation, may refer to:

Places
 Méma, Mali, Africa

People
 Ali Mema (born 1943) Albanian soccer player
 Ardian Mema (born 1971) Albanian soccer player
 Devis Mema (born 1985) Albanian soccer player
 Marin Mema, Albanian journalist
 Sulejman Mema (born 1955) Albanian soccer player

 Mema, an Albanian soccer family, see List of professional sports families

Fictional characters
 Me'ma, a character from the 2012 novel Me’ma and the Great Mountain
 Mema Chaid, a character from the Colombian telenovela La luz de mis ojos

Organizations
 Maryland Emergency Management Agency
 Massachusetts Emergency Management Agency
 Motor & Equipment Manufacturers Association

Other uses
 Mary E. Moss Academy, a school in Maryland, USA